Michael James Dear is an urban geographer and educator. He has written several books, including Why Walls Won't Work: Repairing the US-Mexico Divide, which was published by Oxford University Press in 2013. He teaches City and Regional Planning at the College of Environmental Design of the University of California, Berkeley.

Life and work
Dear was born in Treorchy, Wales.

In 1988, he received a Guggenheim Fellowship.

He worked at the University of Southern California in Los Angeles.

He currently teaches City and Regional Planning at the College of Environmental Design of the University of California, Berkeley, in the United States (he has been at Berkeley since 2009). He is a fellow of the Bellagio Center of the Rockefeller Foundation at Villa Serbelloni on Lake Como in Lombardy, Italy, and of the Center for Advanced Study in the Behavioral Sciences of Stanford University in Stanford, California.

He is a fellow of the Learned Society of Wales.

Publications
The Postmodern Urban Condition. Blackwell/Wiley, 2000. .
Why Walls Won't Work: Repairing the US-Mexico Divide. Oxford University Press, 2013. .
Oxford University Press, 2015. Paperback edition, with new chapter.

Further reading

References

See also
Los Angeles School

External links

Faculty page

Living people
Urban geographers
UC Berkeley College of Environmental Design faculty
1944 births
Fellows of the Learned Society of Wales
University of Southern California faculty